Bront Arson DeFreitas (born 12 November 1978) is a British Virgin Islands cricketer who has played for the Leeward Islands in West Indian domestic cricket.

DeFreitas was born on Saint Vincent, one of the Windward Islands, but has played all his cricket in the Leewards. His first appearances at a regional level came during the 2002–03 Red Stripe Bowl, a limited-overs tournament. He represented the Rest of Leeward Islands team, which was organised during the early 2000s in seasons when Antigua and Barbuda played as a separate team. In 2006 and 2008, DeFreitas appeared for the British Virgin Islands national team in the Stanford 20/20 tournament, where matches held full Twenty20 status. In between, he had made his first-class debut for the Leeward Islands, playing against Trinidad and Tobago in the 2007–08 Carib Beer Cup. The following season, also against Trinidad and Tobago, DeFreitas took his maiden first-class five-wicket haul, 5/88 in a losing cause. His final match for the Leewards came in the 2009–10 Regional Four Day Competition, against the Combined Campuses and Colleges.

References

External links
Player profile and statistics at CricketArchive
Player profile and statistics at ESPNcricinfo

1978 births
Living people
British Virgin Islands cricketers
Leeward Islands cricketers
Saint Vincent and the Grenadines cricketers
Saint Vincent and the Grenadines emigrants to the British Virgin Islands